Model by the Wicker Chair is a 1919–1921 painting by the Norwegian artist Edvard Munch that is in the collection of the Munch Museum in Oslo.

Through a bequest from the Munch Museum, a different version of this painting has been in the collection of  The Metropolitan Museum of Art since 1944.

Description 
The painting depicts a female art model standing next to a wicker chair.

Exhibitions 
The painting was on display in New York City at the Museum of Modern Art as part of its "Edvard Munch: The Modern Life of the Soul" exhibition, which opened on February 19, 2006 and ran through May 8, 2006.

The painting was on display in Madrid, Spain at the Thyssen-Bornemisza Museum as part of its "Edvard Munch: Archetypes" exhibition, which opened on October 6, 2015 and ran through January 17, 2016.

The painting was on display in New York City at the  Neue Galerie as part of its  "Munch and Expressionism" exhibition, which opened on February 18, 2016 and ran through June 13, 2016.  It was 1 of only 19 ‘Oil on canvas’ works by Munch chosen to be a part of this exhibition, as selected by curator  Jill Lloyd together with art historian Reinhold Heller.

See also 
List of paintings by Edvard Munch

Notes

References
 

Nude art
Paintings by Edvard Munch
Paintings in the collection of the Munch Museum
Paintings in the collection of the Metropolitan Museum of Art